European standard EN 71 specifies safety requirements for toys. Compliance with the standard is legally required for all toys sold in the European Union.

The standard has been published in 14 parts:
 EN 71-1: Mechanical and physical properties
 EN 71-2: Flammability
 EN 71-3: Specification for migration of certain elements
 EN 71-4: Experimental sets for chemistry and related activities
 EN 71-5: Chemical toys (sets) other than experimental sets
 EN 71-6: Graphical symbols for age warning labelling
 EN 71-7: Finger paints
 EN 71-8: Swings, slides and similar activity toys for indoor and outdoor family domestic use
 EN 71-9: Organic chemical compounds – Requirement
 EN 71-10: Organic chemical compounds – Sample preparation and extraction
 EN 71-11: Organic chemical compounds – Methods of analysis
 EN 71-12: N-Nitrosamines and N-Nitrosatable Substances
 EN 71-13: Olfactory board games, cosmetic kits and gustative games
 EN 71-14: Trampolines for domestic use

References

Safety
00071
Toy safety